The Conservation Foundation is a non-governmental, not-for-profit 501(c)(3) organization with a mission to
preserve open space and natural lands, protect rivers and watersheds, and promote stewardship of the environment.

It serves northern Illinois counties of DuPage, Kane, Kendall and Will.

McDonald Farm
In 1992, Lenore Clow McDonald donated her 60-acre farm to The Conservation Foundation, subject to conservation easement. The farm now serves as headquarters for the organization.

Located on the farm is a partner organization, The Resiliency Institute, which uses permaculture education and design to foster resilient lifestyles, landscapes and communities.

Green Earth Harvest
A major program at the Foundation is Green Earth Harvest. This is a certified organic farm that provides local, organic vegetables through environmentally sustainable methods.

References

External links

Green Earth Harvest website

Ecology organizations
Environmental organizations based in Illinois
Nature conservation organizations based in the United States